is a railway station in the city of Seto, Aichi Prefecture,  Japan, operated by Meitetsu.   Passengers can transfer to Setoshi Station on the Aichi Loop Line.

Lines

Station layout
The station has two opposed side platforms connected by a footbridge. The station has automated ticket machines, Manaca automated turnstiles and is staffed.

Platforms

Adjacent stations

|-
!colspan=5|Nagoya Railroad

Station history
It was renamed  on June 1, 1935. The Seto Electric Railway was absorbed into the Meitetsu group on September 1, 1939. The station was renamed to its present name on October 1, 1971.

Passenger statistics
In fiscal 2017, the station was used by an average of 5538 passengers daily.

Surrounding area
Seto Fire Department
 Suinan Elementary School

See also
 List of Railway Stations in Japan

References

External links

 Official web page 

Railway stations in Japan opened in 1905
Railway stations in Aichi Prefecture
Stations of Nagoya Railroad
Seto, Aichi